Thord Rubert "Flodan" Flodqvist (5 August 1926 – 15 March 1988) was a Swedish ice hockey goaltender who won a bronze medal at the 1952 Winter Olympics. He played 82 international matches with the Swedish national team between 1946 and 1958, and was the primary goaltender in 1952–57. He won the world title in 1953 and 1957, finishing third in 1954 and 1958. Nationally he became Swedish champion in 1953 and 1956 with Södertälje SK.

Flodqvist was instrumental in winning the 1957 world title in Moscow. In a final-round match against the Soviet Union, Sweden needed a tie to win the tournament. In the final minutes, with the score 4-4, the Soviets attacked heavily, and Flodqvist stopped one of the shots by his cheek. Goaltenders did not wear helmets then, and Flodqvist had a high fever throughout the game. He fell unconscious on the ice, yet continued the match. After retiring from competitions he worked as a coach with Södertälje SK junior teams.

References

1926 births
1988 deaths
AIK IF players
Ice hockey players at the 1952 Winter Olympics
Olympic bronze medalists for Sweden
Olympic ice hockey players of Sweden
People from Södertälje
Södertälje SK players
Olympic medalists in ice hockey
Medalists at the 1952 Winter Olympics
Sportspeople from Stockholm County